Hennes may refer to:

Business
 H&M, a Swedish multi-national retail-clothing company
 Hennes (magazine), a Swedish magazine

Places
 Hennes, Norway, a village in Hadsel municipality, Nordland county, Norway

Music
 Hennes bästa, a compilation album from Swedish pop singer Lena Philipsson

People
 Rainer Hennes (born 1943), a West German sprint canoer
 Tanja Schmidt-Hennes (born 1971), a former German professional cyclist